Provokacija (English translation: Provocation) is the third studio album by Montenegrin singer Boban Rajović. It was released in the summer of 2006.

Track listing
Main songs
Koga foliraš (Who Are You Fooling)
Provokacija (Provocation)
Bilo bi zabavno (It Would Be Fun)
Presuda (Verdict, duet Katarina Kaya Ostojić)
Flaša (Bottle, cover of "Çıtı pıtı" by İsmail YK)
Nazdravi i zapjevaj (Toast and Sing)
Ubi me ti (You Killed Me, cover of "Osad Eini" by Amr Diab)
Na dan kad si rođena (On the Day You Were Born)
Jugoslavijo (Yugoslavia)

Bonus tracks
Puklo srce (My Heart Exploded)
Piroman (Arsonist)

References

External links
Boban Rajović's discography, with the full album freely available for online listening

2006 albums
Boban Rajović albums